Queen's County was a UK Parliament constituency in Ireland, returning two Members of Parliament from 1801 to 1885 and one from 1918 to 1922.

Boundaries
This constituency comprised the whole of Queen's County, now known as County Laois, except for the parliamentary borough of Portarlington 1801–1885.

Members of Parliament

MPs 1801–1885

MPs 1918–1922 

Note:-
 1 Date of polling day. The result was declared on 28 December 1918, to allow time for votes cast by members of the armed forces to be included in the count.

Elections

Elections in the 1830s

 

Parnell was appointed as Secretary of State for War, requiring a by-election.

Elections in the 1840s

Elections in the 1850s

Elections in the 1860s

Elections in the 1870s
FitzPatrick was made Lord Castletown, causing a by-election.

 4358

Elections in the 1880s

Elections in the 1910s

References

The Parliaments of England by Henry Stooks Smith (1st edition published in three volumes 1844–50), 2nd edition edited (in one volume) by F.W.S. Craig (Political Reference Publications 1973)

Historic constituencies in County Laois
Westminster constituencies in Queen's County (historic)
Dáil constituencies in the Republic of Ireland (historic)
Constituencies of the Parliament of the United Kingdom established in 1801
Constituencies of the Parliament of the United Kingdom disestablished in 1885
Constituencies of the Parliament of the United Kingdom established in 1918
Constituencies of the Parliament of the United Kingdom disestablished in 1922